Chicche may refer to:

Thomas Chicche of the noble Chicche family of Canterbury, England
Chicche District